Sergio Abreu may refer to:

Sergio Abreu (politician) (born 1945), Uruguayan politician
Sérgio Abreu (footballer) (born 1967), French footballer who played as a defender
Sérgio Abreu (actor) (born 1975), Brazilian actor